Margarita Peak is a prominent mountain in San Diego County. Its  summit is the 32nd most prominent peak in San Diego County. Margarita Peak is owned by the Fallbrook Land Conservancy, which has closed public access to the peak and the surrounding Margarita Peak Preserve for biological studies and sensitive habitat. The trail to the peak was relatively little-used and not known by many people. It was considered one of San Diego's greatest hidden gems, due to the breathtaking 360-degree panorama views at the top. Persons attempting to reach the peak had to use a steep, poorly maintained firebreak that connected to the main trail. The hike to the top was  each way.

References

External links 
 Margarita Peak Preserve  at Fallbrook Conservancy
 
 Margarita Peak Summit Panoramic on YouTube

Mountains of San Diego County, California
Santa Margarita Mountains
Mountains of Southern California